West Down was a UK Parliament constituency in Ireland which returned one Member of Parliament from 1885 to 1922, using the first past the post electoral system.

Boundaries and Boundary Changes
This county constituency was first created in 1885 from the western part of Down. There was a boundary change altering this division in 1918, when the new Mid Down constituency was created, and West Down was redefined.

1885–1918: The baronies of Lower Iveagh, Lower Half, and Lower Iveagh, Upper Half, and that part of the barony of Iveagh Upper, Upper Half lying within the parishes of Aghaderg, Annaclone and Seapatrick.'.

1918–1922: The rural district of Moira; the part of the rural district of Banbridge which is not included in the East Down constituency; and the urban districts of Banbridge and Dromore.'.

Maps showing the component units of the constituency can be seen here.

Prior to the 1885 United Kingdom general election and after the dissolution of Parliament in 1922 the area was part of the Down constituency.

Politics
The constituency was strongly unionist in 1918, when Sinn Féin only polled 1,725 votes. Two subsequent by-elections produced unopposed returns for the Unionist candidates.

The First Dáil
Sinn Féin contested the general election of 1918 on the platform that instead of taking up any seats they won in the United Kingdom Parliament, they would establish a revolutionary assembly in Dublin. In republican theory, every MP elected in Ireland was a potential Deputy to this assembly. In practice, only the Sinn Féin members accepted the offer.

The revolutionary First Dáil assembled on 21 January 1919 and last met on 10 May 1921. The First Dáil, according to a resolution passed on 10 May 1921, was formally dissolved on the assembling of the Second Dáil. This took place on 16 August 1921.

In 1921 Sinn Féin decided to use the UK authorised elections for the Northern Ireland House of Commons and the House of Commons of Southern Ireland as a poll for the Irish Republic's Second Dáil. This area, in republican theory, was incorporated in an eight-member Dáil constituency of Down.

Members of Parliament

Elections

Elections in the 1880s

Hill was re-appointed Comptroller of the Household, requiring a by-election.

Elections in the 1890s

 Hill resigned.

Elections in the 1900s

 Hill resigns.

 Liddell resigns.

 Hill resigns.

Elections in the 1910s

Wilson appointed as Recorder of Belfast

Wallace appointed Chief Clerk to the High Court of Northern Ireland

See also
 List of UK Parliament Constituencies in Ireland and Northern Ireland
 Redistribution of Seats (Ireland) Act 1918
 List of MPs elected in the 1918 United Kingdom general election
 List of Dáil Éireann constituencies in Ireland (historic)
 Members of the 1st Dáil

References

External links
 https://www.oireachtas.ie/en/members/
 https://www.oireachtas.ie/en/debates/

Westminster constituencies in County Down (historic)
Dáil constituencies in Northern Ireland (historic)
Constituencies of the Parliament of the United Kingdom established in 1885
Constituencies of the Parliament of the United Kingdom disestablished in 1922